The Dublin Area Rapid Transit system (stylised as DART) is an electrified commuter rail railway network serving the coastline and city of Dublin, Ireland. The service makes up the core of Dublin's suburban railway network, stretching from Greystones, County Wicklow, in the south to Howth and Malahide in north County Dublin. The DART serves 31 stations and consists of 53 route kilometres of electrified railway ( double track,  single), and carries in the region of 20 million passengers per year.

The DART system was established by Córas Iompair Éireann in 1984 to replace an ageing fleet of diesel-powered locomotives. Since 1987 the service is operated by Iarnród Éireann, Ireland's national rail operator.

History

Initial development
The section of trackbed between Dún Laoghaire and Dublin City was originally laid out as part of the Dublin and Kingstown Railway, Ireland's first railway. This line was later connected with the Belfast mainline to the north and Wexford mainline to the south and joined the Harcourt Street line at Shanganagh Junction. The scenic views from the railway over Dublin Bay at this point have been compared to those on the Gulf of Naples and have resulted in trips to Killiney Hill and Greystones along the line becoming tourist attractions.

Prior to electrification in 1984, the line was operated using 1950s-era CIÉ 2600 Class rail cars which had been converted in the early 1970s to push-pull operation. These diesel-powered trains were powered by a CIE 201 Class locomotive, with a driving trailer carriage on the other end. This service was notoriously uncomfortable, unreliable, and overcrowded. By the late 1970s, the need for an urgent upgrade to the system had become apparent, as the 2600 Class railcars were in poor condition. Replacement parts had become difficult to obtain due to the age of the rolling stock and its conversion to push-pull operation, which had been intended as a temporary measure until a more permanent solution could be established, had come to the end of its serviceable life.

In conjunction with electrification, three new stations at Sandymount, Booterstown and Salthill and Monkstown were added to the network in 1984. Sandymount and Booterstown were each built at the sites of a previous station while Salthill and Monkstown were built near the site of the original Kingstown railway terminus, between Seapoint and Dún Laoghaire. As electrification work was undertaken from 1981–1982, a spur which had served the ferry port at Dún Laoghaire was disconnected from the mainline as the installation of overhead power lines to service the harbour would have necessitated the lowering of the track which travelled through a portal south of Dún Laoghaire station.

Early DART services ran from the north-eastern suburb of Howth, through Connolly, Tara Street, and Pearse stations in the city centre and on to Bray, which lies on the border between Dublin and Wicklow. This route remained unchanged for almost sixteen years until the line between Bray and Greystones was electrified. Further electrification of the line took place between Howth Junction & Donaghmede and Malahide, the northernmost DART station, on the Belfast mainline.

Operation
The DART service is operated by a mixed fleet of electric multiple unit trains. As of 2019, the trains run every ten minutes on weekdays with a reduced service on weekends. Trains north of Howth Junction are split between Howth and Malahide while the Malahide service is supplemented by Northern Commuter trains.

Trains are typically run as four-car, six-car or eight-car sets during the 07.00–09.30 and 17.00–19.00 weekday peak periods. Capacity is reduced during off-peak periods and at weekends, with up to four eight-car sets running. Four-car sets typically consist of a single 8500 Class unit while six-car sets are made up of three 8100 Class units. Eight-car sets can be made up of either two 8500 Class or four 8100 Class units. Both classes had worked in tandem prior to the refurbishment of the ageing 8100 Class in 2007, after which both have been run separately.

Forty two-car 8100 Class units were purchased to run the initial network. Two of these were damaged beyond repair in a depot fire in 2001. Expanding passenger numbers and the need to refurbish the ageing 8100 Class units saw the purchase of four 8500 Class train sets in 2000. These were complemented with three 8510 Class sets in 2001 and ten 8520 Class sets in 2003 and 2004. The now-withdrawn 8200 Class sets which were first run in 2000 operated until 2008 at which point they were retired from revenue service and decommissioned due to longstanding technical issues. A redevelopment of the network's stations was undertaken between 2003 and 2005 to lengthen platforms to accommodate eight-car sets, upgrade the power grid, and improve accessibility for disabled passengers.

Service
All trains in the Dublin suburban area, including DART services, are monitored and regulated by a Central Traffic Control (CTC) facility located in Connolly Station, known as Suburban CTC. This facility has been extensively automated and requires a staff of five; two signallers, one with responsibility for level crossings, an electrical control officer, who supervises the electrical power supply equipment and an overall supervisor. The main CTC is staffed at all times however, there are also backup local control rooms which allow services to continue in the event of serious technical problems.

A single driver is responsible for the management of each train from the cab in the leading carriage. Automatic doors are controlled by the driver and are armed upon arrival at stations. Real-time passenger information displays on station platforms offer passengers updates on the next train arrival times, service updates and outages. Automatic PA announcements are made in case of service disruptions and are tailored to each station.

The majority of stations on the network have been renovated to include automatic barriers which require passengers to submit their tickets for verification before they can set foot on the platform. A ticket is required in advance of boarding DART services and can be purchased at stations from manned kiosks and automated machines. Passengers can also avail of the option of using a Leap Card, Dublin's integrated ticketing scheme. Leap cards are offered as contactless cards onto which passengers can load set ticket options or a cash balance. Leap fares are typically cheaper than paying in cash for a journey. On the DART network, users tag on at their point of entry and tag off at their exit point. Irish Rail, along with Dublin's other public transport operators operated its own smart card system which was phased out to coincide with the Leap Card's introduction. Revenue protection officers check passengers' tickets to ensure validity both onboard trains and on station platforms at random intervals.

DART stations

South of Howth Junction
 
 
 
 
 
 
 
South of the River Liffey
 
 
 
 
 
 
 
 
 
 
South of Dún Laoghaire

Future

DART+

In February 2018, the Irish government and National Transport Authority announced a 10-year plan to electrify the lines to Drogheda, Maynooth, Hazelhatch, M3 Parkway and Docklands. The proposed project, which had previously been referred to as "DART Expansion", was renamed "DART+" in 2020.

In 2019, a tender for up to 600 hybrid battery/electric units was issued (to provide fleet capacity for the proposed expansion), and a tender was also issued for initial design work on the additional electrification requirements. A new DART station, Woodbrook railway station, was also proposed to be built between Shankill and Bray on the southern section of the DART line.

The initial phase of the DART+ plan, the "DART+ West" project, proposes to provide  of electrification to Maynooth, M3 Parkway and Docklands; with a new EMU maintenance depot at Maynooth and additional works in relation to signalling and level crossing closures. The DART+ West project progressed to the design stage as of April 2019, and the planning stage in December 2021.

Former/suspended proposals

Several proposals have been made to expand the DART network beyond the coastal mainline and provide service to the north and west of the city. These expansion plans included a proposed tunnel linking the Docklands Station at Spencer Dock in the city's quays and Heuston Station. This proposed DART Underground project, first posited in 1972, included plans for services from Celbridge/Hazelhatch to the Docklands via St. Stephen's Green. The DART Underground project was put on hold in September 2015. While included in the Greater Dublin Transport Strategy 2016-2035 (published in 2016), the DART Underground proposal was not included in the Greater Dublin Area Strategy 2022-2042 (published in 2021).

DART Line 1
The "DART Line 1" project proposed that the southern portion of the existing DART line would branch west after Connolly Station to run onto the Western Commuter line. This proposal included electrification as far as Maynooth. The branch to Navan (currently constructed and operational to M3 Parkway) was also due to be electrified as far as Dunboyne.

DART Line 2
The northern portion of the DART line (north of Connolly Station) was proposed to be linked using the DART Underground to the Heuston main line via Docklands station at Spencer Dock and Heuston Station. This tunnel would link the DART directly with existing Luas light rail lines, bus routes, and proposed Metro lines and extend the high-frequency DART service to the Kildare commuter line. In April 2009, it was proposed that an electrification project would extend the DART as far as Drogheda.

Rolling stock

Current fleet

Former fleet

Proposed fleet changes

In 2017, IÉ announced plans to procure a new fleet of trains with the intention of extending DART services from 2023 onwards. An initial purchase of 100 vehicles was proposed to allow replacement of the existing fleet; this proposed purchase would include bi-mode units to allow services to run beyond the existing electrified network.

In December 2021, IÉ announced that Alstom had been selected as the provider of up to 750 new vehicles, with 325 planned as part of the DART+ plan. Part of Alstom's X'Trapolis family, an initial purchase of 95 vehicles is to be undertaken, formed into 19 5-car units. A total of 13 of these are due to be fitted both with pantographs to operate using the  OHLE on the main DART network, and batteries to allow operation on non-electrified routes. The remaining units in the initial batch are expected to also be 5-car, fitted with pantograph only.

DART's competitors
Iarnród Éireann, the operator of DART services, operates a rail monopoly. They also operate faster Commuter and InterCity services, which compete with journeys from Greystones, Bray Daly, Dún Laoghaire Mallin, Blackrock, Sydney Parade, Lansdowne Road, Grand Canal Dock, Dublin Pearse, Tara Street, Dublin Connolly, Howth Junction & Donaghmede, Clongriffin, Portmarnock and Malahide. The only other company to operate on lines in the Republic of Ireland is Northern Ireland Railways, which jointly operates the cross-border Enterprise service between Dublin and Belfast.

A number of other public transport modes are available in Dublin. The CIÉ-owned Dublin Bus and the private Go-Ahead Ireland (owned by Go-Ahead Group) run all over the city and have many routes that run parallel to DART for stretches.  However, they do not have any scheduled routes that traverse the entire length of the DART line. As in the rest of Ireland, integration of bus and rail services is limited, though there are some "feeder bus" routes for which it is possible to buy a through ticket valid for both the rail and bus section of the journey. Travel passes and integrated ticketing (Leap Cards) for DART, Luas and Dublin Bus services were introduced in 2011.

Gallery

See also 

 Rail transport in Ireland
 Multiple units of Ireland

References 

1984 in rail transport
Dublin Suburban Rail
Iarnród Éireann
Rail transport in the Republic of Ireland
Transport companies of the Republic of Ireland
Transport in County Dublin
Transport in County Wicklow
1984 establishments in Ireland